Animax Entertainment is an animation and interactive production studio producing content for all screens. Founded in 2001 by Dave Thomas, an actor, writer, and producer known for his Emmy award-winning work on SCTV, Animax's clients include Disney, ESPN, Warner Bros., National Geographic, Sesame Workshop, WWE and many others. Animax won a Sports Emmy Award in 2006 and was nominated again in 2007 for their work on ESPN.com's "Off-Mikes", based on Mike Golic and Mike Greenberg and their ESPN Radio show Mike and Mike in the Morning.  The series was also selected as Adobe Systems' Site of the Day on June 20, 2006. In 2007 the company branched out into live-action production with the launch of a viral video series for Kodak and another for Carl's Jr. that gained "Immortal" status on Funny or Die.

Divisions
The main studio has won a number of awards in addition to the Emmy including multiple Webby Awards, multiple Summit Awards, and multiple Los Angeles Advertising Club Belding Bowls among others.  In 2009 the company was added to the Inc. 500 list of fastest growing companies in America.

Animations

Animax produced "Where's My Water?: Swampy's Underground Adventures in house for the Disney Channel as well as the cut scenes for the game "Wheres My Water 2" from Disney Interactive.

The company's television properties include the Canadian animated sitcom Bob & Doug, a revival of their respective SCTV characters, and Popzilla for MTV.

In 2012, Animax animated three two-minute shorts for NBC's hit show Community.  The shorts titled "Abed's Master Key," celebrated the return of Community to TV and were featured on the NBC website and Hulu.

Games

In 2007, Animax produced the first ever virtual world for girls for the maker of the Beanie Babies, Ty Inc for a new product line called Ty Girlz.

References

Notes
 ESPN's Off-Mikes - Sports Emmy Award-winning animated series
 Sports Emmy Nominees and Winners

External links
 Animax Entertainment
 Animax Entertainment Blog

American companies established in 2001
American animation studios
Computer animation studios
Entertainment companies based in California
Companies based in Los Angeles
Mass media companies established in 2001
2001 establishments in California